Thargelia gigantea is a species of moth of the family Noctuidae. It is found from Morocco to Algeria, Libya, Israel and the Sinai in Egypt.

Adults are on wing from January to April. There is one generation per year.

External links
 Hadeninae of Israel

Hadeninae
Moths of the Middle East